Leverage-point modeling (LPM) is a demonstrated approach for improved planning and spending for operations and support (O&S) activities. LPM is a continuous-event simulation technique that uses the system dynamics approach of model building. Dr. Nathaniel Mass championed the potential of LPM, and adapted it for the Department of Defense (DoD) as a tool for jumping to a higher performance curve as a means of offsetting higher costs and declining budgets. The purpose of LPM is to test policies and investments that improve mission capability for a given level of investment or funding. It is particularly used to evaluate investments in component reliability and parts availability.

DoD context 
DoD is moving towards a performance-based strategy and contracting focus as the preferred weapon systems sustainment plan, streamlining contracting and financing mechanisms in order to buy availability and readiness measured by performance criteria.  Performance Based Logistics (PBL) strategy is applied to achieve near-term improvements in end-to-end sustainment, material readiness, and Total life-cycle systems management (TLCSM) through public-private partnerships that combine best practice capabilities of industry and organic support. Leverage point models illustrate where small differences in operational thinking can make a large impact on cost, readiness or productivity. In DoD context, these models are built with a perspective (e.g. O&S) that makes clear purpose, and emphasize variables such as the accumulations of end items and components in states of repair and disrepair. LPM identifies high-level leverage points such as reliability investment, improved parts availability, and investment in Diagnosis/Test. LPM results may be used to support Program Objective Memorandum (POM) or Reduced Total Ownership Cost (R-TOC) efforts.

Modeling approach 
Leverage point models are typically expressed through differential equations that reflect analysis based on system dynamics, focusing on how important variables of a system interact to produce behavior of a system over time. System Dynamics is appropriate for the analysis of dynamic problems where there is change in the system over time. The important variables interact to generate the dynamics of mission capability, cost, and other system variables.

There are three elements of the system dynamics method that differentiate it from other modeling methods. First, is to explain why a system changes over time as opposed to why a system is in a particular state at a point in time.  For example, statistical analysis could be very useful for understanding the factors that were correlated with mission capability in 2005.  System Dynamics could be useful in understanding relationships that caused mission capability (MC) to change over the last 5 years.

Second, the method takes a broad view of the factors that cause changes in MC as opposed to a more detailed microscopic view.  One way to analyze MC is to focus on the detailed technological factors that cause components to fail.  This would involve root cause analysis and perhaps the design of experiments. A complementary LPM/system dynamics perspective considers how the major subsystems of a supply chain interact to affect MC.
  
The broad view is important for anticipating otherwise unanticipated side effects.  Often, the benefits of productive investments in one part of a system can be nullified by unanticipated negative reactions, or 'rogue outcomes', to those investments in another part of the system. System dynamics modeling has been shown to provide some early warning of 'unintended consequences'.

The system dynamics perspective has important implications for the type of detail included in the model. Other modeling methods, for example discrete event simulation, usually involve many complex details (e.g. specific airplanes), where LPM focuses on a relatively few major components that are responsible for most end item failures, yet includes a great deal of dynamic complexity by modeling the interactions between multiple subsystems.  Dynamic and detail complexity are both important to understand but are usually best approached through different modeling methods.

Third, the System Dynamics method, unlike other modeling approaches, shows reciprocal feedback relationships between variables instead of simple one-way causality.  Most statistical models are based on one- way causal relationship between a set of independent variables and a dependent variable.  For example, component failures could be correlated with various conditions on the production line.  System Dynamics models, such as those underlying LPM, include two way causality in which a variable “a” has a causal effect on variable “b” and “b” feeds back to affect “a”.  For example, end-item failures reduce the number of planes’ available flying hours.  A fleet’s fewer available flying hours increases the required number of hours flown per plane which increases end-item failures.  The interaction between failures and hours flown creates a self-reinforcing relationship that is called a positive feedback loop.  Positive feedback loops are also known as vicious or virtuous circles (or cycles).

Determining leverage 
Leverage is found during analysis of modeling results, by exploring positive or negative behaviors, looking for sources of pressure and imbalance that cause things to change, and determining changes to structure, so that behavior is improved and bad events become less frequent.
Each model structure represents logic that determines behavior, and events are snapshots of that behavior:

•An event is an occurrence or happening of significance to our understanding of complex system behavior.

•A behavior pattern is something that connects together a long series of events over time.

•Structure is the set of physical and information interconnections that generate behavior.

In the language of system dynamics, important system variables are represented as stocks, flows, and feedback loops.  Stocks are the accumulations points in a system. Simple examples of stocks are water that accumulates in a bathtub, accumulations of product inventory, or money that accumulates in a bank account. Stocks are measured in units such as gallons, items, or dollars. Flows are variables that add to or subtract from stocks.  The flow into the bathtub is water flowing through the faucet while the outflow is water flowing down the drain. The inflow into inventory is production while the outflow is shipments. Flows are measured in units per time such as gallons per minute, items per month, or dollars per year. Interacting stocks and flows generate the dynamic behavior of metrics such as MC and cost.

Uncovering leverage points involves understanding feedback loops that link variables, or factors, that cause behavior in other variables. Feedback loops are either self-reinforcing (good or bad) or goal-seeking (seeking equilibrium). Synthesis of improved courses of action arises from mitigating bad (vicious circles) self-reinforcing feedback loops, exploiting good (virtuous circles) and goal-seeking feedback loops, and iteratively optimizing them, typically using parameter-driven simulations. Leverage point models accomplish this simulation capability in software tools that follow system dynamics conventions. These conventions capture model structure and attach algebraic relationships to all the variables appearing in a diagram, including time span and steps.

See also
Donella Meadows
Twelve leverage points

References

Further reading
 Nathaniel Mass (2005). "The Relative Value of Growth". In: Harvard Business Review, April 2005.
 Donella H. Meadows (1997). "Places to Intervene in a System". in: Whole Earth.
 Nathaniel J Mass (1975) "Economic cycles: An analysis of underlying causes", January 1975.

External links
 Department of Defense - Leverage Point Modeling portal

Mathematical optimization in business